Westwood/UCLA Station is a planned heavy-rail subway station on the D Line of the Los Angeles County Metro Rail system. The station will be located under Wilshire Boulevard between Veteran Avenue and Westwood Boulevard, with the main station entrance to the west of Gayley Avenue. Other entrances will be located on the north and south sides of Wilshire Boulevard and the west side of Westwood Boulevard.

The station is currently under construction, part of phase 3 of the D Line Extension project, with contractors hired in 2019. The station is slated to open along with Westwood/VA Hospital station in 2027. The Sepulveda Pass Transit Corridor is planned to connect to the D Line at this station.

Attractions 
Nearby destinations include the University of California, Los Angeles (UCLA) and the neighborhood of Westwood.

References

External links 
 Metro Los Angeles - Purple Line Extension

Future Los Angeles Metro Rail stations
Railway stations scheduled to open in 2027